Bin Bucheng (12 January 1880 – 27 December 1943) was a Chinese politician and educator. He became the president of Hunan University in 1913, and served until 1923.

Names
His style name was Min'gai,  and his art name was Yilu.

Biography
Bin was born Bin Xiaocong in Dong'an County, Hunan, on January 12, 1880, during the Qing Empire. He attended Lianghu Academy and Jiangbin School. In 1900, the Qing government sent him to Germany to study at Technical University of Berlin, majoring in mechanical engineering. He joined the Tongmenghui when he was in Berlin.

He returned to China in 1908, he worked as an engineer at Guangdong-Hubei Railway Bureau, and later became the factory director of Jinling Arsenal. In 1913, he was appointed as president of Hunan University, and held that office until 1923. Hunan University's motto, "Seeking Truth from Facts and Daring to be Pioneers", was founded by Bin Bucheng.

He founded Pili Pao in 1932. In January 1938, he served as president of Guomin Daily.

During the Second Sino-Japanese War, he was a member of the Hunan government and the director of Hunan Refugee Relief Agency.

He founded Seventh Hunan Provincial High School and Mingxian Girls' School in 1942.

On December 27, 1943, he died of illness in Changsha, Hunan.

References

External links

1880 births
Politicians from Yongzhou
1943 deaths
Technical University of Berlin alumni
Educators from Hunan
Presidents of Hunan University
Republic of China journalists
Writers from Hunan
Republic of China politicians from Hunan